The Central California League was a minor league baseball league that played in the 1910 and 1911 seasons. The Class D level league franchises were based exclusively in California. The league had a multitude of franchise relocations, before it permanently folded during the 1911 season. The 1910 Alameda Alerts and 1911 San Leandro Cherry Pickers captured league championships.

History
The league franchises were unstable during two seasons of play. The league began play on April 17, 1910 and played through November 6, 1910. Of the eight original teams that started 1910 league play, seven of the eight teams moved during the season, with three teams moving twice or more, while three teams disbanded. In all, 15 different sites were used in the 1910 season, with two cities hosting two different Central California League teams.  In 1911, two teams moved and two folded before the league permanently folded on July 9, 1911. The league played a full schedule, but only the weekend games counted in the standings.

Cities represented
Alameda, CA: Alameda Bracketts 1910; Alameda Alerts 1910–1911; Alameda Monday Models 1911 
Berkeley, CA: Berkley 1910; Berkeley Clarions 1911 
Elmhurst, CA: Elmhurst 1910; Elmhurst Carroll & Tilden 1911 
Fruitvale, CA: Fruitvale 1910; Fruitvale Travelers 1911
Hayward, CA: Hayward 1910; Hayward Cubs 1911 
Healdsburg, CA: Healdsburg Grapevines 1910 
Napa, CA: Napa 1910 
Oakland, CA: Oakland Basches 1910; Oakland Emery Arms 1911 
Petaluma, CA: Petaluma Incubators 1910 
Richmond, CA: Richmond Merchants 1910–1911 
St. Helena, CA St. Helena 1910 
San Leandro, CA: San Leandro Grapevines 1910; San Leandro Cherry Pickers 1911 
San Rafael, CA: San Rafael 1910 
Santa Rosa, CA: Santa Rosa Prune Pickers 1910
Vallejo, CA: Vallejo 1910; Vallejo Pastimes 1911

Standings & statistics 
1910 Central California League
 The league played a full schedule but only the weekend games counted. Healdsburg moved to San Leandro April 24; St. Helena moved to Fruitvale April 24, then to Alameda July 10; Santa Rosa moved to Alameda May 5, then to Oakland July 10, then to Berkeley July 31. Valleyjo and Napa disbanded May 29; Petaluma moved to Elmhurst June 5; San Rafael moved to Hayward June 12, then to Fruitvale July 10. The franchise disbanded October 9.Playoff: Alameda Alerts 2 games, Richmond 0.

1911 Central California Leagueschedule
Fruitvale (1–7) moved to Alameda May 28; Elmhurst moved to Oakland June 4, disbanded June 18; Berkeley disbanded June 23 The league disbanded July 9.

References

Baseball leagues in California
Defunct minor baseball leagues in the United States
Sports leagues established in 1910
Sports leagues disestablished in 1911
1910 establishments in California
1911 disestablishments in California